Lu-diĝira was a Sumerian nobleman and poet of Nippur who dedicated a love poem to his mother and two elegies to his father and wife. The eulogies with which he glorifies his mother have been compared to the Song of Songs.

References

Çig, M, and Kramer, S.N., "The Ideal Mother: A Sumerian Portrait", Belleten 40 (1976), 413-421.
Civil, Miguel, "The 'Message of Lú-dingir-ra to His Mother' and a Group of Akkado-Hittite 'Proverbs'", Journal of Near Eastern Studies 23 (1964), 1-11.
Cooper, Jerrold S., "New Cuneiform Parallels to the Song of Songs", Journal of Biblical Literature'' 90 (1971), 157-162.
Nougayrol, Jean, "Textes Suméro-Accadiens des archives et bibliothéques privées d'Ugarit", Ugaritica 5 (1968), 1-446:.-

External links

The message of Lu-dingira to his mother: composite text; translation, the Electronic Text Corpus of Sumerian Literature

Sumerian literature
Sumerian people